Rand Paul (born 1963) is a United States Senator from Kentucky.

Senator Paul may also refer to:

Alexander Paul (1875–1954), Wisconsin State Senate
Allen Paul (politician) (born 1945), Indiana State Senate
George Howard Paul (1826–1890), Wisconsin State Senate
John Paul (judge) (1839–1901), Virginia State Senate
John Paul (pioneer) (1758–1830), Ohio State Senate and Indiana State Senate
John Paul Jr. (judge) (1883–1964), Virginia State Senate
Rusty Paul (fl. 1990s–2010s), Georgia State Senate

See also
James Paull (1901–1983), West Virginia State Senate